Cottingham Phoenix are a rugby league team based in Cottingham, East Riding of Yorkshire. They play in the Yorkshire Premier division of the Rugby League Conference.

History
Hull Phoenix joined the Yorkshire division of the Rugby League Conference in 2004. A year later, they stepped up to the newly created Central Premier with their A team taking their place in the Yorkshire division.

Hull Phoenix moved to Cottingham for the 2006 summer season and became the open age summer team of Cottingham Tigers RLFC under the name Cottingham Phoenix. The Premier divisions underwent a restructure and Cottingham found themselves playing in the North Premier, Phoenix were successful in finishing top of the league but lost narrowly in extra time in the Grand final against East Lancashire Lions.

Cottingham accepted an invitation to play in the revamped Rugby League Conference National Division during summer 2007. Cottingham Phoenix were subsequently expelled about half-way through the season for forfeiting three fixtures.

The club returned to the Rugby League Conference in 2009 joining the newly created Yorkshire Premier Division.

Rugby League Conference teams
Rugby clubs established in 2004
Rugby league teams in the East Riding of Yorkshire